Roland Perret (23 October 1927 – 12 February 2006) was a Swiss equestrian. He competed in two events at the 1956 Summer Olympics.

References

External links
 

1927 births
2006 deaths
Swiss male equestrians
Olympic equestrians of Switzerland
Equestrians at the 1956 Summer Olympics
Sportspeople from Thurgau